Eburodacrys is a genus of beetles in the family Cerambycidae, containing the following species:

 Eburodacrys aenigma Galileo & Martins, 2006
 Eburodacrys alini Napp & Martins, 1980
 Eburodacrys amazonica Melzer, 1927
 Eburodacrys apua Martins & Galileo, 2005
 Eburodacrys asperula Bates, 1880
 Eburodacrys assimilis Gounelle, 1909
 Eburodacrys ayri Galileo & Martins, 2006
Eburodacrys bezarki Botero, 2017
Eburodacrys biffipradorum Martins & Galileo, 2012
 Eburodacrys bilineata Joly, 1992
 Eburodacrys callixantha Bates, 1872
 Eburodacrys campestris Gounelle, 1909
 Eburodacrys catarina Galileo & Martins, 1992
 Eburodacrys cincora Martins, Galileo & Limeira-de-Oliveira, 2011
 Eburodacrys coalescens Bates, 1884
 Eburodacrys costai Gounelle, 1909
 Eburodacrys crassimana Gounelle, 1909
 Eburodacrys crassipes Martins & Galileo, 2008
 Eburodacrys cunusaia Martins, 1997
 Eburodacrys decipiens Gounelle, 1909
 Eburodacrys dubitata White, 1853
 Eburodacrys eburioides (White, 1853)
Eburodacrys eduardoi Botero, 2017
 Eburodacrys elegantula Gounelle, 1909
 Eburodacrys errata Galileo & Martins, 2010
 Eburodacrys eurytibialis Monné & Martins, 1992
 Eburodacrys flexuosa Gounelle, 1909
 Eburodacrys fortunata Lameere, 1884
 Eburodacrys fraterna Galileo & Martins, 2010
 Eburodacrys gaucha Galileo & Martins, 1992
 Eburodacrys gigas (Gounelle, 1909)
 Eburodacrys granipennis Gounelle, 1909
 Eburodacrys guttata Martins & Galileo, 2005
 Eburodacrys havanensis Chevrolat, 1862
 Eburodacrys hirsutula Bates, 1870
 Eburodacrys inaequalis Galileo & Martins, 2009
 Eburodacrys laevicornis Bates, 1884
 Eburodacrys lancinata Napp & Martins, 1980
 Eburodacrys lanei Zajciw, 1958
 Eburodacrys lenkoi Napp & Martins, 1980
 Eburodacrys lepida Martins, 1973
 Eburodacrys longilineata White, 1853
 Eburodacrys luederwaldti Melzer, 1922
 Eburodacrys lugubris Gounelle, 1909
 Eburodacrys mancula White, 1853
 Eburodacrys martinezi Martins, 1997
Eburodacrys mcgavini Pett, 2019
 Eburodacrys megaspilota White, 1853
 Eburodacrys monticola Monné & Martins, 1973
 Eburodacrys moruna Martins, 1997
 Eburodacrys nemorivaga Gounelle, 1909
 Eburodacrys notula Gounelle, 1909
 Eburodacrys obscura Martins, 1973
 Eburodacrys perspicillaris (Erichson in Schomburg, 1848)
 Eburodacrys pilicornis Fisher, 1944
 Eburodacrys pinima Martins, 1999
 Eburodacrys prolixa Monné & Martins, 1992
 Eburodacrys puella (Newman, 1840)
 Eburodacrys pumila Monné & Martins, 1992
 Eburodacrys punctipennis White, 1853
 Eburodacrys putia Galileo & Martins, 2006
 Eburodacrys quadridens (Fabricius, 1801)
 Eburodacrys raripila Bates, 1870
 Eburodacrys rhabdota Martins, 1967
 Eburodacrys rubicunda Monné & Martins, 1992
 Eburodacrys rufispinis Bates, 1870
 Eburodacrys sanguinipes Gounelle, 1909
Eburodacrys santossilvai Botero, 2017
 Eburodacrys seabrai Zajciw, 1958
 Eburodacrys seminigra Gounelle, 1909
 Eburodacrys separata Martins, Galileo & Limeira-de-Oliveira, 2011
 Eburodacrys sexguttata Lameere, 1884
 Eburodacrys sexmaculata (Olivier, 1790)
 Eburodacrys silviamariae Galileo & Martins, 2006
Eburodacrys skillmanni Galileo, Martins & Santos-Silva, 2015
 Eburodacrys stahli Aurivillius, 1893
 Eburodacrys sticticollis Bates, 1874
 Eburodacrys sulfurifera Gounelle, 1909
 Eburodacrys sulphureosignata (Erichson, 1847)
 Eburodacrys superba Napp & Martins, 1980
 Eburodacrys translucida Galileo & Martins, 2010
 Eburodacrys trilineata (Aurivillius, 1893)
 Eburodacrys triocellata (Stål, 1857)
 Eburodacrys truncata Fuchs, 1956
 Eburodacrys tuberosa Gounelle, 1909
 Eburodacrys vidua (Lacordaire, 1869)
 Eburodacrys vittata (Blanchard, 1847)
Eburodacrys wappesi Galileo, Martins & Santos-Silva, 2015
 Eburodacrys xirica Martins & Galileo, 2005
Eburodacrys yolandae Botero, 2017

References

External links
 iNaturalist Word Checklist

 
Eburiini